Chief Election Commissioner may refer to:
 Chief Election Commissioner of Bangladesh
 Chief Election Commissioner of India
 Chief Election Commissioner of Pakistan